Previously named Leonas de Ponce, Ponce Leonas is the professional female volleyball team of Ponce, Puerto Rico. Their home stadium is Cancha Salvador Dijols in Playa de Ponce, Ponce, Puerto Rico.

History

The team was founded in 1985.

Squads

Previous

Current
As of February 2017
 Head coach:  Ramon Hernandez

Palmares

League Championship 
1989,1990,1991

References

External links
 Team website
 League Official website

Puerto Rican volleyball clubs
Volleyball clubs established in 1985
1985 establishments in Puerto Rico
Sports teams in Ponce, Puerto Rico